The Explosive were an English psychedelic rock that released five singles under the President label, later releasing two singles under Plexium featuring Del Taylor.

Discography

Watson T. Browne and the Explosive
 "Some Loving" / "Home Is Where Your Heart Lies" -  President PT 207 - 1968
 "Crying All Night" / "I Close My Eyes" -  President PT 221 - 1968

The Explosive With Del Taylor
  "Im Gonna Use What I Got To Get What I Need" / "Am I A Fool ?" - President PT 286 - 1970

The Explosive
 "Who Planted Thorns In Miss Alice's Garden" / "Get My Kicks From Living" - President PT 262 - 1969
 "Cities Make The Country Colder" / "Step Out Of Line" -  President PT 244 - 1969
 "This Ain't The Road To Freedom" / "Today Is Today" - President PT 302 - 1970
 "Love Doesn't Come Easy" / "See You In The Morning" - Plexium PXM 24 - 1971
 "Hey Presto, Magic Man" / "Get It Together" - Plexium PXM 20 - 1971

Appear on compilation
 Hide and Seek: British Blue Eyed Soul 1964-1969 -  Watson T. Browne & The Explosive - "I Close My Eyes" 
 The Electric Asylum Volume 1 - Rare British Acid FreakRock Music - Past & Present PAPRCD2093 - The Explosive "Hey Presto, Magic Man"

References

English psychedelic rock music groups
English rock music groups